Dauer (German "die Dauer", English "the enduring", "the duration" in the meaning of "a length of time",) describes an alternative developmental stage of nematode worms, particularly rhabditids including Caenorhabditis elegans, whereby the larva goes into a type of stasis and can survive harsh conditions. Since the entrance of the dauer stage is dependent on environmental cues, it represents a classic and well studied example of polyphenism. The dauer state is given other names in the various types of nematodes such as ‘diapause’ or ‘hypobiosis’, but since the C. elegans nematode has become the most studied nematode, the term ‘dauer stage’ or 'dauer larvae' is becoming universally recognised when referring to this state in other free-living nematodes. The dauer stage is also considered to be equivalent to the infective stage of parasitic nematode larvae.

As E. Maupas first proposed in 1899-1900, all nematodes have five stages separated by four moults. Under environmental conditions that are favorable for reproduction, C. elegans larvae develop through four stages or moults which are designated as L1, L2, L3 and L4. After L4, animals moult to the reproductive adult stage. However, when the environment is unfavorable, L1 and L2 animals have the option to divert their development from reproduction to dauer formation. Signals such as temperature, food supply, and levels of a dauer-inducing pheromone, a population density cue, influence this dauer decision. Dauer larvae are thus considered an alternative L3 stage larva, and this stage is sometimes preceded by L2d. L2d animals are considered pre-dauer and are characterised by delayed development and dark intestines produced by storage of fat. L2d larvae can either continue normal development or enter dauer stage depending on whether the conditions that triggered their formation persist. Dauer is not, however, a permanent condition. In fact, if the food supply and the population density become optimal for growth the dauer larvae can exit this stage and become L4s and then adults.
 
Dauer larvae are extensively studied by biologists because of their ability to survive harsh environments and live for extended periods of time. For example, C. elegans dauer larvae can survive up to four months, much longer than their average lifespan of about three weeks during normal reproductive development. Two genes that are essential for dauer formation are daf-2 and daf-23. Dauer formation in C. elegans requires a nuclear receptor DAF-12 and a forkhead transcription factor DAF-16. In favorable environments, DAF-12 is activated by a steroid hormone, called dafachronic acid, produced by the cytochrome p450, DAF-9. DAF-9 and DAF-12 have been implicated by Cynthia Kenyon and colleagues as being required for extended longevity seen in animals that lack germlines. Kenyon showed that, although the daf-16 gene is required for life extension in C. elegans, the life extension effect can be uncoupled from dauer growth arrest. The lifespan increase was shown to be associated with an increase in stress resistance.

A characteristic of the dauer stage is the pronounced alae which may be implicated in the entering (L1) and exiting (pre adult or L4 in C. elegans) of the dauer stage.

Dauer larvae generally remain motionless, but can react to touch or vibrations. They can stand on their tails, waving their bodies in the air, and attach themselves to any passing animals, particularly insects, enabling them to travel to new food sources. For example, dauer larvae of rhabditids are often found in parallel rows under the elytra of dung beetles, which transport them to fresh supplies of dung.

C. elegans strains lacking polyunsaturated fatty acids (PUFAs) undergo increased dauer arrest when grown without cholesterol. A study found endocannabinoids inhibit the dauer formation caused by PUFA deficiency or impaired cholesterol trafficking.

See also 
 Genetics of aging
 Polyphenism

References

External links 
 Synthesis and Activity of Dafachronic Acid Ligands for the C. elegans DAF-12 Nuclear Hormone Receptor 
 Dafadine inhibits DAF-9 to promote dauer formation and longevity of Caenorhabditis elegans

Nematode anatomy
Caenorhabditis elegans
Larvae